The 2016 European Darts Grand Prix was the ninth of ten PDC European Tour events on the 2016 PDC Pro Tour. The tournament took place at Glaspalast in Sindelfingen, Germany, between 16–18 September 2016. It featured a field of 48 players and £115,000 in prize money, with £25,000 going to the winner.

Kim Huybrechts was the defending champion, but lost in the semi-finals to Michael van Gerwen. Van Gerwen went on to win the title after defeating Peter Wright 6–2 in the final.

Prize money
The prize money of the European Tour events stays the same as last year.

Qualification and format
The top 16 players from the PDC ProTour Order of Merit on 27 July automatically qualified for the event and were seeded in the second round. The remaining 32 places went to players from three qualifying events - 20 from the UK Qualifier (held in Barnsley on 5 August), eight from the European Qualifier and four from the Host Nation Qualifier (both held on 15 September).

Daryl Gurney who had to withdraw from the last two European Tour events due to a broken finger on his throwing hand, also pulled out of this event after failing to recover. Third seed Dave Chisnall also withdrew due to an neck injury, moving seeds 4-16 up a place, and promoting UK Qualifier Steve Beaton to 16th seed.

Arron Monk also withdrew due to personal reasons the day the tournament began, thus giving Robbie Green a bye to the second round. The remaining places were filled with two additional Host Nation Qualifiers.

The following players took part in the tournament:

Top 16
  Michael van Gerwen (winner)
  Peter Wright (runner-up)
  Ian White (second round)
  Kim Huybrechts (semi-finals)
  Michael Smith (third round)
  Benito van de Pas (quarter-finals)
  James Wade (quarter-finals)
  Mensur Suljović (third round)
  Gerwyn Price (quarter-finals)
  Jelle Klaasen (second round)
  Terry Jenkins (second round)
  Stephen Bunting (quarter-finals)
  Alan Norris (third round)
  Simon Whitlock (second round)
  Joe Cullen (third round)
  Steve Beaton (third round)

UK Qualifier
  Daryl Gurney (withdrew)
  Arron Monk (withdrew)
  Andy Boulton (first round)
  Jonny Clayton (third round)
  Scott Dale (first round)
  Nathan Aspinall (second round)
  James Wilson (third round)
  Mick McGowan (second round)
  Robbie Green (second round)
  Brendan Dolan (second round)
  Robert Owen (first round)
  James Hubbard (first round)
  Jay Foreman (first round)
  Mark Frost (second round)
  Scott Taylor (first round)
  Alan Tabern (second round)
  Joe Murnan (third round)
  Devon Petersen (first round)
  Darren Webster (second round)

European Qualifier
  Raymond van Barneveld (semi-finals)
  Cristo Reyes (second round)
  Christian Kist (first round)
  Ronny Huybrechts (first round)
  Jermaine Wattimena (second round)
  Jeffrey de Graaf (first round)
  Robert Marijanović (first round)
  Tony West (second round)

Host Nation Qualifier
  Max Hopp (second round)
  Dragutin Horvat (first round)
  Martin Schindler (second round)
  Fabian Herz (first round)
  Robert Allenstein (first round)
  Gabriel Clemens (first round)

Draw

References

2016 PDC European Tour
2016 in German sport